"Heat" is a song recorded by the Danish band Scarlet Pleasure. This song is the most selling of Scarlet Pleasure and is produced by David Mørup and mixed by Jean-Marie Horvat, who also mixed for stars like Michael Jackson, Rihanna, Chris Brown and Jessie J.

Charts 
The song reached No. 14 in the Tracklisten, the Danish Singles Chart, after release on Copenhagen Records / Universal Music.

References 

Scarlet Pleasure songs
2015 singles
2015 songs
Copenhagen Records singles